We Can Be Heroes is a 2020 American superhero film written and directed by Robert Rodriguez. It is both a standalone and legacy sequel to the 2005 film The Adventures of Sharkboy and Lavagirl in 3-D. Rodriguez was also the cinematographer and editor of the film, which stars YaYa Gosselin, Lyon Daniels, Andy Walken, Hala Finley, Lotus Blossom, Dylan Henry Lau, Andrew Diaz, Isaiah Russel-Bailey, Akira Akbar, Nathan Blair and Vivien Lyra Blair. It was released on December 25, 2020, by Netflix and received mixed reviews from critics. A sequel is in development.

Plot

Missy Moreno is at home with her dad, Marcus, when they receive word to come to the rescue of heroes where Missy has to go with her father and be with other Heroics' children.

Missy meets the other children there: 

 Wheels, who possesses super-strength, but his muscles are too heavy for his skeletal system to support.
 Noodles, who can stretch his body.
 Ojo, who is mute and communicates through art.
 A-Capella, who can telekinetically manipulate objects by singing
 Slo-Mo, who is always in slow motion
 Face Maker, who can morph his face into anyone
 Rewind and Fast Forward, twins that can alter time
 Wild Card, who has immense powers but no control over it
 Guppy, who has "shark strength" and can shape water into anything she can imagine

The kids watch the battle between the aliens and Heroics on television, ending with the Heroics' capture. Missy realizes that Ojo's drawings tell the future. When a drawing shows aliens breaking into the vault, the kids hatch a plan to escape.

Face Maker tricks the guards into coming into the vault where Guppy subdues them, but not before one of the guards triggers an emergency lockdown. Rewind sends them back in time, Wheels stops the guard from pushing the button, and Noodles steals their security badges. Mrs. Granada spots Missy in the hallway and seals the doors, but A-Capella makes a staircase to the roof, allowing them to escape. Noodles secure a vehicle, and the kids escape.

They land at the home of Missy's grandmother, Anita Moreno, who is the Heroics' trainer and helps the kids master their powers and work as a team. The aliens arrive and Grandma sends the kids through a tunnel that leads to an empty field before she is captured. The kids spot an empty alien craft and use it to reach the Mother ship. Locating a room with a purple pyramid, they see the president and Ms. Granada speaking. They are alien spies, sent to prepare Earth for a "takeover". The kids are placed in a cell. Guppy makes a replica of the key from the children's tears and opens the door. A fight between the kids and the aliens ensues, and Wild Card is caught and taken for questioning while the others seek the pyramid.

Wheels hacks into the motherboard, but Ojo reveals that she can speak and is the Supreme Commander of the aliens. Missy communicates with Wild Card in the control room; Face Maker has switched places with him. Granada goes after Wild Card, but not before the protective shield around the motherboard is deactivated. With the kids holding off the aliens, Wheels and Noodles remove the motherboard and swap it with a new one deactivating the alien's rocket and foiling the takeover. To the kids' surprise, their parents emerge from the rocket. Ojo reveals that she and Ms. Granada faked the "takeover" to train the kids to be the new Heroics. The kids reunite with their parents and are soon ready to save the world.

Cast

Production
Robert Rodriguez wrote, directed, and produced We Can Be Heroes through his Troublemaker Studios. Priyanka Chopra, along with Christian Slater and Pedro Pascal, were announced to star. Principal photography began in August 2019, shooting in Texas. Visual effects were provided by Weta Digital. The score was recorded at Synchron Stage in Vienna.

Release
The film was released on December 25, 2020, pushed forward from a January 1, 2021, release date.

Reception

Audience viewership
Upon its release, the film was the most-watched title in its opening weekend, then finished third the following weekend before returning to first in its third weekend. It finished second behind new Netflix release Outside the Wire in its fourth weekend. It was revealed that the film has been seen in 53 million households during the first four weeks. It was the most-watched film on Netflix in 2021.

Critical response 
The site's consensus reads, "Although it may be too zany for adults, We Can Be Heroes balances its sophisticated themes with heart and zealous originality." On Metacritic, the film has a weighted average score of 51 out of 100, based on reviews from 10 critics, indicating "mixed or average reviews".

David Ehrlich of IndieWire called it a "zany, imaginative, and extremely kid-oriented Avengers riff that combines major stars with Snapchat-level special effects in order to lend a live-action Saturday morning cartoon vibe to a story about seizing your own destiny, We Can Be Heroes is the ultimate Troublemaker movie."

Sequel
In January 2021, Netflix announced they are planning to develop a sequel. By August of the same year, Rodriguez confirmed that he would return in his role as director, while announcing that principal photography would take place in 2022.

References

External links
 
 

2020s teen comedy films
2020s superhero films
2020 science fiction action films
American science fiction action films
American superhero films
American children's comedy films
American children's fantasy films
2020s English-language films
English-language Netflix original films
Films directed by Robert Rodriguez
Films produced by Robert Rodriguez
Films with screenplays by Robert Rodriguez
Troublemaker Studios films
Films about fictional presidents of the United States
Teen science fiction films
Films shot in Texas
2020s American films